Ronaldo Junior Vásquez Herasme (born 30 June 1999) is a Dominican professional footballer who plays as a forward for Liga Dominicana club Atlético Pantoja and the Dominican Republic national team.

Club career
Vásquez began his football training in La Meca del Fútbol. In 2013, he joined FCBEscola Santo Domingo, related to the Spanish club FC Barcelona.

In 2016, he made his professional debut in Liga Dominicana de Fútbol playing for Atlético Pantoja, where he was a member of the youth team. In 2017, he moved to the Atlético Pantoja first squad.

International career
Vásquez made his formal debut for Dominican Republic on 22 March 2018, playing an entire 4–0 friendly win against Turks and Caicos Islands, scoring twice. He had played two friendly matches in November 2017 against Nicaragua, but they were not recognised by FIFA.

International goals
Scores and results list Dominican Republic's goal tally first

Honors and awards

Clubs
Atlético Pantoja
Caribbean Club Championship: 2018

Individual
Best player: Copa Walon 2016 (playing for Atlético Pantoja)

References

External links

1999 births
Living people
Dominican Republic footballers
Association football forwards
Association football midfielders
Dominican Republic under-20 international footballers
Dominican Republic international footballers
Atlético Pantoja players
Hapoel Tel Aviv F.C. players
CD El Ejido players
Dominican Republic expatriate footballers
Dominican Republic expatriates in Israel
Expatriate footballers in Israel
Dominican Republic expatriate sportspeople in Spain
Expatriate footballers in Spain
Liga Dominicana de Fútbol players